Amicalola may refer to:

 Amicalola, Georgia, unincorporated community
 Amicalola Creek
 Amicalola Falls, waterfall in Dawson County, Georgia